This is a list of members of the South Australian Legislative Council between 2010 and 2014, spanning the 51st (started 2006) and 52nd (starting 2010) Parliament of South Australia. As half of the Legislative Council's terms expired at each state election, half of these members were elected at the 2006 state election with terms expiring in 2014, while the other half were elected at the 2010 state election with terms expiring in 2018.

 Bernard Finnigan was suspended from the Labor Party on 2 May 2011. He sat in parliament thereafter as an independent.
 Labor MLC Paul Holloway resigned on 15 August 2011. Gerry Kandelaars was appointed as his replacement on 13 September 2011.
 Labor MLC Bob Sneath resigned on 5 October 2012. Kyam Maher was appointed as his replacement on 17 October 2012.

Members of South Australian parliaments by term
21st-century Australian politicians